Lance "Fearless" Gibson (born November 20, 1970 in Toronto, Ontario) is a retired Canadian mixed martial artist. Having formally competed in the Middleweight division. He is widely considered to be one of Canada's mixed martial arts pioneers and was a finalist at the Superbrawl 4 tournament, he competed in organizations such as UFC, Shooto and Superbrawl.

Gibson is married to former Bellator Women's Featherweight Champion Julia Budd. Gibson is also the father of current Bellator lightweight fighter Lance Gibson, Jr.

Mixed martial arts record

|-
| Loss
| align=center| 4-5
| Masanori Suda
| Decision (unanimous)
| Shooto: Treasure Hunt 1
| 
| align=center| 3
| align=center| 5:00
| Tokyo, Japan
| 
|-
| Loss
| align=center| 4-4
| Evan Tanner
| TKO (punches)
| UFC 29
| 
| align=center| 1
| align=center| 4:48
| Tokyo, Japan
| 
|-
| Win
| align=center| 4-3
| Masanori Suda
| Decision (majority)
| Shooto - R.E.A.D. 6
| 
| align=center| 3
| align=center| 5:00
| Tokyo, Japan
| 
|-
| Win
| align=center| 3-3
| Jermaine Andre
| KO (knee)
| UFC 24
| 
| align=center| 3
| align=center| 3:35
| Louisiana, United States
| 
|-
| Win
| align=center| 2-3
| Akihiro Gono
| Decision (majority)
| SB 13 - SuperBrawl 13
| 
| align=center| 3
| align=center| 5:00
| Hawaii, United States
| 
|-
| Loss
| align=center| 1-3
| Rocky Batastini
| KO (punch)
| SB 10 - SuperBrawl 10
| 
| align=center| 1
| align=center| 0:09
| Guam
| 
|-
| Loss
| align=center| 1-2
| Dan Severn
| Submission (keylock)
| SB 5 - SuperBrawl 5
| 
| align=center| 1
| align=center| 26:22
| Guam
| 
|-
| Win
| align=center| 1-1
| Peter Matautia
| Submission (rear naked choke)
| SB 4 - SuperBrawl 4
| 
| align=center| 1
| align=center| 1:33
| Hawaii, United States
| 
|-
| Loss
| align=center| 0-1
| Bob Gilstrap
| TKO (punches)
| SB 4 - SuperBrawl 4
| 
| align=center| 1
| align=center| 4:53
| Hawaii, United States
|

As an actor
Hung faan aau (1995) - Tony's Gang Member
University Hospital (1995, TV Series) - Rocky
Jack Reed: One of Our Own (1995, TV Movie) - Manny Campton 
The Sentinel (1996, TV Series) - Frank
Viper (1997, TV Series) - Bouncer 
The Crow: Stairway to Heaven (1999, TV Series) - Batboy
Sweetwater (1999, TV Movie) - Security Guard 
Romeo Must Die (2000) - Doorman 
Seven Days (2000, TV Series) - Fearless
Ladies and the Champ (2001, TV Series) - Dannybrook Brooks
Dark Angel (2001-2002, TV Series) - Man on the Street #3 / Half Dead
Jeremiah (2003, TV Series) - Enforcer
Jake 2.0 (2003, TV Series) - Burns
X-Men: The Last Stand (2006) - Spike

References

External links
 
 
 

1970 births
Living people
Canadian Christians
Canadian male mixed martial artists
Middleweight mixed martial artists
Mixed martial artists utilizing pankration
Canadian male television actors
People from Port Moody
Ultimate Fighting Championship male fighters